Xiangsha Yangwei Wan is a black pill with a dark brown core, and is used in Traditional Chinese medicine to "regulate the function of the stomach". It is slightly aromatic and tastes pungent and slightly bitter. It is used when there are symptoms of "anorexia, vomiting of acid fluid, epigastric distension and lassitude".

Chinese classic herbal formula

See also
 Chinese classic herbal formula
 Bu Zhong Yi Qi Wan

References

Traditional Chinese medicine pills